Martlets Hospice is a hospice in Hove, England, established in 1997. It is a registered charity (no. 802145). The hospice provides end-of-life care to people in the Brighton and Hove area.

The hospice is named after the mythical Sussex bird, a Martlet, which also appears in the Sussex crest.

History 
Martlets Hospice opened in 1997, following the merger of three separate charities. These were: Tarner, which opened in 1935; Coppercliff, which opened in 1967; and the MacMillan Day Hospice.

The hospice provides care in the hospice building, which has 18 beds and in peoples' homes in Brighton and Hove and surrounding areas including Newhaven and Peacehaven.  Care is provided free for adults aged over the age of 18 who have terminal illnesses including cancer, motor neurone disease, parkinsons and alzheimers.

The hospice is not part of the National Health Service, although reports that just under one third of its funding comes from the NHS. Patients need to be referred to the hospice by a health professional.

They have seven charity shops throughout the Brighton and Hove area and own Martlets Care, a paid-for care agency.

Art Trails 

In 2016, Martlets held 'Snowdogs by the Sea', a Snowdogs Art Trails in Brighton and Hove arranged by Wild In Art. They placed nearly 50 Snowdog sculptures throughout the city, designed by artists, which were then auctioned. It raised £337,000 for the charity.

Following the success of the first trail, Martlets organised Snailspace in 2018. Brighton-based YouTuber Alfie Deyes, crime writer Peter James and DJ Fatboy Slim all sponsored Snails in the trail. As part of the event, Fatboy Slim walked round all 50 Snails to raise funds for the charity. At the end of the trail, the Snails were sold at auction for £231,400.

Patron, Ambassadors and trustees 
The hospice Patron is HM Lord Lieutenant Peter Field. Ambassadors for the charity include Carol Harrison, Fatboy Slim and Peter James.

The current Chair of Trustees is Juliet Smith, a former magistrate. She has been the chairwoman since 2016.

Other notable supporters include TV Vet Marc Abraham, who campaigned for Lucy's Law in the United Kingdom.

Notable patients 
The hospice cared for The Architects guitarist Tom Searle, who died in the hospice in 2016. In response to the care provided, the band held a fundraiser for the hospice, raising over £19,000.

British glovemaker Corneila James died in the hospice in 1999, her son is the crime author Peter James, who remains as a patron and supporter of the charity today.

References 

Hospices in the United Kingdom
Health in Sussex
Palliative care in England
Hospices in England